Blow Your Headphones is the second studio album by The Herbaliser. It was released on Ninja Tune in 1997. It peaked at number 24 on the UK R&B Albums Chart.

Critical reception
In 1999, Ryan Schreiber, the founder and then-editor-in-chief of Pitchfork, wrote that "...Blow Your Headphones was pretty decent, but it was kinda crappy for a Ninja Tune record." In 2015, Fact placed it at number 33 on the "50 Best Trip-Hop Albums of All Time" list.

Track listing

Personnel
Credits adapted from liner notes.

 Jake Wherry – production, mixing
 Ollie Teeba – production, mixing, design concept
 Jonny Cuba – production (3, 15)
 Malachi – production (5, 6, 8)
 Kaidi Tatham – production (11), synthesizer (11)
 What What – vocals (2, 7, 16)
 Fabian – vocals (10)
 Big Ted – vocals (10)
 Patrick Dawes – percussion (8)
 Oliver Parfitt – synthesizer (17)
 No Sleep Nigel – mixing (1, 2, 3, 4, 5, 6, 9, 10, 11, 13, 14, 16, 18)
 Justin Whillock – mixing (7, 8, 12, 15, 17)
 Openmind – design
 Strictly Kev – design concept
 Nancy Brown – photography
 Suzi Ninja – photography

Charts

References

External links
 

1997 albums
The Herbaliser albums
Ninja Tune albums